Sir Richard Jennings MP (c. 1619 – 8 May 1668), was an English nobleman and politician who sat in the House of Commons at various times between 1642 and 1668. He took the Parliamentary side in the Civil War. He was the father of Sarah Churchill, Duchess of Marlborough, who was the confidante of Queen Anne.

Jennings succeeded his father, Sir John Jennings, as head of the family in August 1642, and took residence at Sandridge in Hertfordshire. His mother was Alice, daughter of Sir Richard Spencer of Offley, who bore his father no less than 22 children. He was also elected as Member of Parliament (MP) for St Albans in succession to his father in 1642.

He fought for the parliamentary cause in the Civil War, and was captured by the Royalists and imprisoned for some time. As a moderate, he was secluded from parliament under Pride's Purge in December 1648. He was re-elected MP for St Albans in Richard Cromwell's Third Protectorate Parliament in 1659. He took a leading role in the restored Long Parliament during the few weeks of 1660 when the secluded members resumed their seats, and was then elected MP for St Albans for the Convention Parliament. He was re-elected MP for St Albans in 1661 for the Cavalier Parliament and sat until his death in 1668.

Jennings married Frances Thornhurst, daughter and heiress of Sir Gifford Thornhurst, 1st Baronet and Susanna Temple. She brought with her the manor of Agney, Kent. Their daughters, Sarah and Frances, were both noteworthy figures at the court of Charles II. Frances, nicknamed "La Belle Jennings", became maid of honour to the Duchess of York in 1664, and eventually by her second marriage to Richard Talbot became Countess of Tyrconnel. Sarah married John Churchill, the future Duke of Marlborough, in 1677, and was highly influential during the reign of Queen Anne. Abigail Masham, who ultimately supplanted her in the Queen's confidence, was a first cousin of Sarah, the child of Elizabeth Jennings Hill, one of Richard's 21 siblings.

Jenning's estates, initially divided between his two daughters, were later consolidated by Sarah's husband.

References

 The Peerage: Richard Jenyns

1610s births
1668 deaths
Roundheads
English MPs 1640–1648
English MPs 1659
English MPs 1660
English MPs 1661–1679